Thomas Müller (born February 2, 1902, date of death unknown) was a German Waffen-SS officer who commanded the SS-NCO Training School (Waffen-SS-Unterführerschule) in Radolfzell, 9th SS Panzer Division Hohenstaufen, 17th SS Panzergrenadier Division Götz von Berlichingen and the 6th SS Volunteer Sturmbrigade Langemarck during World War II. He saw action on the East and the West, finishing the war on the Oder front.

Biography
Müller was born in Munich, Bavaria on February 2, 1902. He served with the Freikorps in 1920. Between February 1941 and February 1943 Thomas Müller was commander and tactics instructor of the SS-NCO Training School in Radolfzell. After that, he commanded a regiment of 9th SS Panzer Division Hohenstaufen (February 20, 1943 - June 29, 1944). He assumed command of 9th SS Panzer Division from June 30 to July 10, 1944.

Following this, he briefly took command of a new division, the 17th SS Panzergrenadier Division Götz von Berlichingen. He then received command of the 6th SS Volunteer Sturmbrigade Langemarck on October 19, 1944. The Langemarck acted as support for the German Ardennes offensive but after protest from the political SS they returned to the east. He surrendered the division to the Western Allies at Schwerin.

Overview of his SS career

Dates of rank 
 SS-Untersturmführer: September 11, 1934
 SS-Obersturmführer: June 1, 1935
 SS-Hauptsturmführer: November 11, 1936
 SS-Sturmbannführer: October 31, 1939
 SS-Obersturmbannführer: April 20, 1942
 SS-Standartenführer: June 21, 1943

Notable decorations 
 Iron Cross Second (1940) and First (1940) Classes
 Infantry Assault Badge in Bronze (?)

References 

1902 births
SS-Standartenführer
Military personnel from Munich
Recipients of the Iron Cross (1939), 1st class
Year of death missing
People from the Kingdom of Bavaria
Waffen-SS personnel